= Mollee Kruger =

American novelist

- Born: Mollee Coppel; March 28, 1929 (age 97); Bel Air, Maryland, U.S.
- Education: University of Maryland, College Park
- Occupation: Writer
- Years active: 1941–present
- Website: http://www.molleekruger.com/

Mollee Kruger (born March 28, 1929) is an American poet, journalist, and memorialist who currently lives in Rockville, Maryland. She is best known for her light verse about history and politics as well as contemporary Jewish themes underscored by Biblical references.

Kruger's eclectic work appeared in ‘Unholy Writ’, a weekly syndicated column of light verse, which ran from 1967 to 1987 in the Jewish press. Often compared to Ogden Nash and Dorothy Parker, she has written seven poetry collections, two of them on feminist topics. Her most recent work includes The Cobbler’s Last, a memoir of small-town life during the Great Depression, and Swift Seasons, a novel about love and aging, published in 2016 when she was eighty-seven.

Kruger's papers are held by on Special Collections and University Archives at the University of Maryland, her alma mater. Her husband was metallurgist Jerome Kruger, an employee of NIST and professor at Johns Hopkins.

== Works ==
=== Books ===
- Kosher Salt: Contemporary Jewish American Folk Poetry, Humor, and Philosophic Farfel (Rockville, MD), 2017.
- The Swift Seasons, Maryben Books (Rockville, MD), 2016.
- The Cobbler's Last, Maryben Books (Rockville, MD), 2010.
- A Purse of Humorous Verse for the Jewish Woman, Biblio Press (New York, NY), 2005.
- Ladies First: Rhymes & Times of the Presidents' Wives & Other Female Fantasies, Maryben Books (Rockville, MD), 1995.
- Admiral of the Mosquitoes/Columbus and America in Light and Dark Verse, Maryben Books (Rockville, MD), 1990.
- Daughters of Chutzpah, Biblio Press (New York, NY), 1983.
- Yankee Shoes, Biblio Press (New York, NY), 1975.
- More Unholy Writ, Biblio Press (New York, NY), 1973.
- Unholy Writ, Biblio Press (New York, NY), 1970.
- Port of Call, Maryben Books (Rockville, MD), 2020.
